Robert Willard Hudson (April 5, 1930 – October 15, 2018) is a former American football offensive lineman in the National Football League for the New York Giants, the Philadelphia Eagles, and the Washington Redskins.  Hudson also played in the American Football League for the Dallas Texans and the Denver Broncos.  He played college football at Clemson University and was drafted in the 12th round of the 1951 NFL Draft.

Up until his death in 2018, he was living in Rowlett, Texas.

See also
Other American Football League players

References

1930 births
2018 deaths
Sportspeople from Florence, South Carolina
American football offensive guards
Clemson Tigers football players
New York Giants players
Philadelphia Eagles players
Washington Redskins players
Dallas Texans (AFL) players
Denver Broncos (AFL) players
People from Lamar, South Carolina
People from Rowlett, Texas